The 1996 Individual Speedway Junior World Championship was the 20th edition of the World motorcycle speedway Under-21 Championships. The event was won by Piotr Protasiewicz of Poland and he also gained qualification to 1997 Speedway Grand Prix.

World final
August 4, 1996
 Olching, Olching Speedwaybahn
 Referee: Christer Bergström 
 Spectators: about 3000

References

1996
World I J
Individual Speedway
Speedway competitions in Germany